Revolutionary Communist Group of Colombia is a communist group in Colombia. It was founded in 1982, by a group originating in the Marxist–Leninist League of Colombia. It is a founding member of the Revolutionary Internationalist Movement.

References

1982 establishments in Colombia
Communist parties in Colombia
Far-left politics in Colombia
Maoist organizations
Political parties established in 1982
Revolutionary Internationalist Movement
Maoism in South America